Porus or Poros was an ancient Indian king who ruled over a part of the Punjab region of the Indian subcontinent. He is only mentioned in Greek sources.

Life

Background
Porus was the nephew of his more famous namesake, Porus the Elder, who ruled the region between the Jhelum River (Hydaspes) and Chenab (Acesines) rivers.

Reign
Like his uncle, Porus the Younger also ruled a territory within the Punjab region of South Asia. The realm of Porus the Younger was located between the Irāvatī (Hydraōtēs) and Asikni (Akesinēs) rivers, and it corresponded to the easternmost part of the old Gandhāra .

References

Sources

 

History of Punjab
4th-century BC Indian monarchs
Year of birth unknown
Yadava kingdoms